Love Notes may refer to:

 Notes of Love, a 1998 Italian-French romance film, also known as Love Notes
 Love Notes (album), a 1977 jazz album by Ramsey Lewis
 Love Notes (Janie Fricke album), a 1979 country album by Janie Fricke